Alessia Martini (born 10 January 1992) is an Italian professional racing cyclist. She rides for the Aromitalia Vaiano team.

See also
 List of 2015 UCI Women's Teams and riders

References

External links
 

1992 births
Living people
Italian female cyclists
Sportspeople from Arezzo
Cyclists from Tuscany